The 38th Federal Congress of the Spanish Socialist Workers' Party was held in Seville from 3 to 5 February 2012, to renovate the governing bodies of the Spanish Socialist Workers' Party (PSOE) and establish the party's main lines of action and strategy for the next leadership term. The congress was called after the PSOE suffered its worst defeat since the Spanish transition to democracy in the general election held on 20 November 2011. Previous secretary-general José Luis Rodríguez Zapatero had announced in April the same year he would not stand for election to a third term as Prime Minister of Spain, announcing his intention to step down as party leader after a successor had been elected.

The result was a close race between the two candidates to the party leadership: Alfredo Pérez Rubalcaba, the party's candidate for the 2011 general election and former first deputy prime minister and interior minister, and former defence minister Carme Chacón. The ballot saw Rubalcaba win by a 51.0% of the delegate vote (487 votes) to the 48.7% won by Carme Chacón (465 votes), with 2 blank and 1 invalid ballots.

Timetable
The key dates are listed below (all times are CET):

26 November: Official announcement of the congress.
8 January: Federal committee endorsement submission.
9–15 January: Election of congress delegates.
3–5 February: Federal congress.

Candidates

Declined
The individuals in this section were the subject of speculation about their possible candidacy, but publicly denied or recanted interest in running:

José Blanco (age ) — Vice Secretary-General of the PSOE (since 2008); Deputy in the Cortes Generales for Lugo (since 1996); Spokesperson of the Government of Spain (2011); Minister of Development of Spain (2009–2011); Secretary of Organization of the PSOE (2000–2008); City Councillor of Palas de Rei (1991–1999); Senator in the Cortes Generales for Lugo (1989–1996).
Jose Bono (age ) — President of the PSCM–PSOE (1990–1997 and since 2004); President of the Congress of Deputies (2008–2011); Deputy in the Cortes Generales for Albacete and Toledo (1979–1983 and 2008–2011); Minister of Defence of Spain (2004–2006); President of the Junta of Communities of Castilla–La Mancha (1983–2004); Deputy in the Cortes of Castilla–La Mancha for Albacete and Toledo (1983–2004); Secretary-General of the PSCM–PSOE (1988–1990); Fourth Secretary of the Congress of Deputies (1979–1982).
Emiliano García-Page (age ) — Senator in the Cortes Generales appointed by the Cortes of Castilla–La Mancha (since 2011); Mayor of Toledo (since 2007); City Councillor of Toledo (1987–1993 and since 2007); Secretary-General of the PSCM–PSOE in Toledo (since 1997); Second Vice President of the Junta of Communities of Castilla–La Mancha (2005–2007); Deputy in the Cortes of Castilla–La Mancha for Toledo (1995–2007); Regional Minister of Institutional Relations of Castilla–La Mancha (2004–2005); Spokesperson of the Government of Castilla–La Mancha (1993–1997, 1998–1999 and 2001–2004); Spokesperson of the PSOE Group in the Cortes of Castilla–La Mancha (2000–2001); Regional Minister of Social Welfare of Castilla–La Mancha (1999–2000); Regional Minister of Public Works of Castilla–La Mancha (1997–1998); Deputy Mayor for Celebrations of Toledo (1991–1993).
Tomás Gómez (age ) — Senator in the Cortes Generales appointed by the Assembly of Madrid (since 2011); Spokesperson of the PSOE Group in the Assembly of Madrid (since 2011); Deputy in the Assembly of Madrid (since 2011); Secretary-General of the PSM–PSOE (since 2007); Mayor of Parla (1999–2008); City Councillor of Parla (1999–2008).
Eduardo Madina (age ) — Secretary-General of the PSOE Group in the Congress of Deputies (since 2009); Deputy in the Cortes Generales for Biscay and Madrid (since 2004); City Councillor of Sestao (1999–2001).
José Luis Rodríguez Zapatero (age ) — Secretary-General of the PSOE (since 2000); Prime Minister of Spain (2004–2011); Deputy in the Cortes Generales for León and Madrid (1986–2011); President pro tempore of the Council of the European Union (2010); Leader of the Opposition of Spain (2000–2004).

Endorsements
Candidates seeking to run were required to collect the endorsements of at least 10% of federal committee members and of between 20% and 30% of congress delegates.

Opinion polls
Poll results are listed in the tables below in reverse chronological order, showing the most recent first, and using the date the survey's fieldwork was done, as opposed to the date of publication. If such date is unknown, the date of publication is given instead. The highest percentage figure in each polling survey is displayed in bold, and the background shaded in the candidate's colour. In the instance of a tie, the figures with the highest percentages are shaded. Polls show data gathered among PSOE voters/supporters as well as Spanish voters as a whole, but not among delegates, who were the ones ultimately entitled to vote in the congress election.

PSOE voters

Spanish voters

Delegate estimations

Results

Notes

References
Opinion poll sources

Other

2012 conferences
2012 in Spain
Political party leadership elections in Spain
PSOE Congresses
PSOE leadership election